Jeanne Odo or citizen Andotte was born in Port-au-Prince and was a former slave, an abolitionist of Saint-Domingue (now Haiti), and a supercentenarian.

At the age of 114, she presented herself to the National Convention in Paris and called for the abolition of slavery.

She was enthusiastically received, accompanied by a delegation of Blacks, at the Jacobin Club by the deputies François Louis Bourdon de l'Oise, Chabot, Maximilien de Robespierre, Jeanbon Saint-André, Legendre, Maure, and other members on June 3, 1793. Everyone applauded when Chabot swore solidarity with  Black people.

See also 

 Slavery
 Timeline of abolition of slavery and serfdom
 Abolitionism
 Jacobin

References 

17th-century women
18th-century women
Haitian women
French abolitionists
People of Saint-Domingue
Haitian slaves
17th-century slaves
18th-century slaves